() is a Latin phrase that means "first, do no harm".

Non-maleficence, which is derived from the maxim, is one of the principal precepts of bioethics that all students in healthcare are taught in school and is a fundamental principle throughout the world. Another way to state it is that, "given an existing problem, it may be better not to do something, or even to do nothing, than to risk causing more harm than good." It reminds healthcare personnel to consider the possible harm that any intervention might do. It is invoked when debating the use of an intervention that carries an obvious risk of harm but a less certain chance of benefit.

Non-maleficence is often contrasted with its corollary, beneficence.

Origin 
The origin of the phrase is uncertain. Some early versions of the Hippocratic Oath include the promise "to abstain from doing harm" but do not include the precise phrase. Perhaps the closest approximation in the Hippocratic Corpus is in Epidemics: "The physician must ... have two special objects in view with regard to disease, namely, to do good or to do no harm" (book I, sect. 11, trans. Adams).

According to Gonzalo Herranz, Professor of Medical Ethics at the University of Navarre, Primum non nocere was introduced into American and British medical culture by Worthington Hooker in his 1847 book Physician and Patient. Hooker attributed it to the Parisian pathologist and clinician Auguste François Chomel (1788–1858), the successor of Laennec in the chair of medical pathology, and the preceptor of Pierre Louis. Apparently, the axiom was part of Chomel's oral teaching. Hooker, however, was quoting an earlier work by Elisha Bartlett who, on pages 288–289, says "The golden axiom of Chomel, that it is only the second law of therapeutics to do good, its first law being this – not to do harm – is gradually finding its way into the medical mind, preventing an incalculable amount of positive ill.”

However, Hooker used neither the specific expression, nor the traditional Latin phrase. A detailed investigation of the origins of the aphorism was reported by the clinical pharmacologist Cedric M. Smith in the April 2005 issue of The Journal of Clinical Pharmacology. It addresses the questions of the origin and chronology of appearance of the maxim. Rather than being of ancient origin as usually assumed, the specific expression, and its even more distinctive associated Latin phrase, has been traced back to an attribution to Thomas Sydenham (1624–1689) in a book by Thomas Inman (1860), Foundation for a New Theory and Practice of Medicine. Inman's book and his attribution were reviewed by an author who signed simply as "H. H." in The American Journal of the Medical Sciences, also in 1860. An American surgeon, L.A. Stimson, used the expression in 1879 and again in 1906 (in the same journal). That it was in common use by the 20th century is apparent from later mentions, such as by the prominent obstetrician J. Whitridge Williams in 1911, as well as detailed discussion of its use in a popular book authored by Dr. Morris Fishbein, editor of The Journal of the American Medical Association in 1930.

The article also reviews the various uses of the now popular aphorism, its limitations as a moral injunction, and its increasingly frequent use in a variety of contexts.

See also 

 Ahimsa
 Cobra effect
 Ethics
 Harm principle
 Meta-ethics
 Non-aggression principle
 Non-violence
 Nursing ethics
 Physician, heal thyself
 Principle of double effect
 Principlism
...First Do No Harm

References

External links 
 Article presenting various views on the principle of "Do no harm"

Ethical principles
Medical ethics
Latin medical words and phrases
History of ancient medicine
Nursing ethics